Richmond is the name of some places in the U.S. state of Wisconsin:
Richmond, Shawano County, Wisconsin, a town
Richmond, St. Croix County, Wisconsin, a town
Richmond, Walworth County, Wisconsin, a town
Richmond (community), Wisconsin, an unincorporated community